The Movement for Democratic Change – Ncube (MDC–N)  was a Zimbabwean political party led by politician and attorney Welshman Ncube. It was founded in 2005 when the Movement for Democratic Change split apart and in the 2008 general election, it was known as the Movement for Democratic Change – Mutambara (MDC–M) in contrast to the larger Movement for Democratic Change – Tsvangirai (MDC–T). The MDC–N and the MDC–T operated as separate opposition parties until their re-unification in 2018. The re-united party now operates under the original name, the MDC.

Foundation

The Movement for Democratic Change (MDC) was founded in 1999 as an opposition party to the Zimbabwe African National Union – Patriotic Front (ZANU-PF) party led by President Robert Mugabe. The MDC was formed from many members of the broad coalition of civic society groups and individuals that campaigned for a "No" vote in the 2000 constitutional referendum, in particular the Zimbabwe Congress of Trade Unions. The MDC is thus a Social Movement not a political party. It was formed out of a social consensus hence its diverse ideological strands. Social Democracy became a uniting ideology for all the various groups who formed the MDC. The party split following the 2005 Senate election, with Morgan Tsvangirai walking against the popular decision of the National Council.

Inter-formation violence

In July 2006, after attending a political meeting in the Harare suburb of Mabvuku, MP Trudy Stevenson was attacked and suffered panga wounds to the back of her neck and head. The MDC leadership immediately claimed that the attack was carried out by ZANU militants. However, while recovering in hospital, Stevenson identified her assailants as members of a rival faction of the MDC.

2008 presidential election

In the 2008 presidential election, the President of MDC Prof Arthur Mutambara backed Simba Makoni.

2018 election and the re-unification of the MDC

In the lead up to the 2018 Zimbabwean general election, the MDC-N joined an electoral coalition with Movement for Democratic Change – Tsvangirai (MDC–T) and other political parties which was called the MDC Alliance. After that election, the MDC-N, the PDP and the MDC-T re-united under the original party name, the MDC.

Notable party members
Welshman Ncube, President and Minister of Industry and Commerce
Edwin Mushoriwa, Vice-President
David Coltart, Senator for Khumalo Constituency and Minister of Education, Sport and Culture
Ngqabutho Nicholas Dube, National Executive Council Member; Member of Parliament for Umzingwane
Priscilla Misihairabwi, Secretary General and Minister of Regional Integration and International Co-operation
Discent Bajila, Secretary General MDC Youth Assembly and Member of Parliament for Matobo South
 Miriam Mushayi, Director of Strategy
Khumbu Malinga, Youth Assembly Spokesperson

References

External links
Mdcyouthassembly.blogspot.com
Bulawayomdcyouth.blogspot.com
Mdczim.net

2005 establishments in Zimbabwe
2008 Zimbabwean general election
2018 disestablishments in Zimbabwe
Defunct political parties in Zimbabwe
Defunct social democratic parties
Left-wing nationalist parties
Ncube
Pan-Africanism in Zimbabwe
Pan-Africanist political parties in Africa
Political parties disestablished in 2018
Political parties established in 2005
Social democratic parties in Africa
Socialist parties in Zimbabwe
Zimbabwean democracy movements